The fifth series of the Australian cooking game show MasterChef Australia premiered Sunday 2 June 2013 on Network Ten, with replays airing at 11am the following day.

This particular series of the show was won by Emma Dean who had defeated Lynton Tapp and Samira El Khafir in the grand finale on 1 September 2013.

Changes
With the filming location from previous series at 13 Doody Street in Alexandria, New South Wales shutting down in August 2012, the production moved to the Centenary Hall at the Royal Melbourne Showgrounds in Flemington, Victoria. Graeme Stone replaced Nicholas McKay as narrator.

Unlike previous seasons, the audition and preliminary stages were not broadcast; instead the season started with the Top 22 (instead of previously used Top 24). Series 5 featured themed weeks, starting with 'Girls vs. Boys'. Other themes included Italian and Middle Eastern cuisine-focused weeks, a Kids week and weeks based on regions of the country such as the Barossa Valley and Western Australia. Masterclass was filmed in front of a live audience, with Matt Preston joining Gary and George "behind the stove".

Along with the above changes, this season was also cast with contestant's personalities in mind above cooking ability in response to the success of the Seven Network's rival cooking show My Kitchen Rules. The changes were not well received by both critics and audiences, and led to disappointing ratings compared to previous seasons with the show sitting on an average of 570,000.

The Finale featured three finalists instead of two.

Contestants

Top 22 

Future appearances

 Emma Dean appeared on Series 6 as a guest judge for a Mystery Box and Invention test Challenge.
 Emma also appeared on Series 10 at the Auditions to support the Top 50.
 Lynton Tapp appeared on Series 12 and was eliminated on 19 April 2020, finishing 24th .
 Christina Batista appeared on Series 14 and was eliminated on 10 May 2022, finishing 20th.

Guest chefs
Frank Camorra - MasterClass 1
Maggie Beer - Barossa Boot Camp Day 2, MasterClass 2
Will Woods - MasterClass 2
Curtis Stone - Offsite Challenge 1, MasterClass 7
Shannon Bennett - Offsite Challenge 1
Stephanie Alexander - MasterClass 3
Bernard Chu - Elimination Challenge 3
Antonio Carluccio - Offsite Challenge 2, MasterClass 4
Stefano De Pieri - Pressure Test 1
Guillaume Brahimi - Immunity Challenge 2
Russell Blaikie - Immunity Challenge 2
Matt Stone - Elimination Challenge 5
Brendan Pratt - MasterClass 5
Kate Lamont - MasterClass 5
Ian Curley - Elimination Challenge 6
Paul Wilson - MasterClass 6
Daniel Wilson - Pressure Test 2
Nick Palumbo - Second Chance Challenge 3
 Aaron Turner - MasterClass 8
 Kirsten Tibballs - Pressure Test 3, MasterClass 9
 Heston Blumenthal - Pressure Test 4, Immunity Challenge 3, Offsite Challenge 4, Elimination Challenge 10, MasterClass 10
 Greg Malouf - Dubai Team Challenge
 Donovan Cooke - Service Challenge

Elimination chart

  In Week 1, the six worst performers from the Protein Challenge then faced off in an Elimination Challenge, from which the Bottom 3 were decided.
  In Week 2 (Barossa Week), the bottom two contestants from three days of challenges went into the Elimination Challenge at the end of the week.
  In Week 3 (Kids Week), Christina was unwell and did not compete in the challenge. Further the mystery box challenge winner selected 9 other contestants to compete in the Invention Test, where the contestants with the five most impressive dishes went through to the Immunity Challenge. There was no bottom three for this challenge.
  Also in Week 3 (Kids Week), the entire losing team from the Offsite Challenge went into round one of the Elimination Challenge, from which the bottom three were decided.
  In Week 4 (Italian Week), Andrew had to leave the competition due to a constrictive injury. Jules could not cook in the Team Challenge also due to an injury and therefore went straight through to the Pressure Test with the members of the losing team.
  In Week 5 (Wild West Week), the Sunday Challenge was a Team Challenge. One member from the winning team got a chance at immunity, but there was no elimination challenge for the losing team.
  In Week 6 (Heaven & Hell Week), the Sunday Challenge was solely a Mystery Box Challenge, with contestants working in pairs. The two worst performing pairs went into elimination.
  In Week 7 (Fast Food Week), the Sunday Challenge was solely a Mystery Box Challenge, with contestants working in groups of three. The worst performing team went into elimination.
  In Week 8 (Second Chance Week), no Top 10 contestant was eliminated. Instead, nine previously eliminated contestants (excluding Clarissa, Andrew and Totem) returned to win back a spot in the competition, each teamed with a Top 10 contestant excluding Christina. 
  In Week 9 (Love Week), Despite not being in the Bottom three, Noelene was pulled to the Pressure Test as Rishi used his immunity pin.
  In Week 10 (Heston Blumenthal Week), as most impressive performer in the Immunity Challenge, Daniel won a free pass to the following week and the Top 8.
  In Week 11 (World Food Week), the first Elimination Challenge was a draw and neither contestant was eliminated.
  Also in Week 11 (World Food Week), Emma used her immunity pin to avoid the second Elimination Challenge.

Episodes and Ratings
Based on the number of viewers and the nightly ratings, Season 5 of Masterchef was considered the worst season, with the finale being ranked only the 5th most viewed television show that night, compared to every other season of Masterchef ranking #1. It is also the only season of the show to have under 1 million viewers of the finale, and it has received the lowest nightly rankings with several episodes below the top 20 in terms of most viewed shows. In total there were only half the number of viewers from Season 4. As a result of the show's poor audience response Network Ten cancelled all spin-off versions of Masterchef Australia (including: Junior Masterchef and Masterchef: The Professionals as well as live events such as Masterchef Live and Masterchef Dining) in order to focus on "a new, fresh version in 2014 that will appeal to the loyal MasterChef fans as well as new viewers" according to Ten's chief programming officer, Beverley McGarvey.

References

External links
Official website

2013 Australian television seasons
MasterChef Australia
Television shows filmed in the United Arab Emirates